Phantom King may refer to:
 Phantom King (light novel) is a light novel written by Korean writer Rim Dal Yeong.
 Phantom Evil King is a boss in the 2001 video game Okage: Shadow King.